Sailor are a British pop/glam rock group, best known in the 1970s for their hit singles "A Glass of Champagne" and "Girls, Girls, Girls", written by the group's lead singer and 12-string guitar player, Georg Kajanus.

In the 1970s
The group's leader, Georg Kajanus, had previously written "Flying Machine" for Cliff Richard in 1971, although it was Richard's first British single that failed to reach the top 30. Sailor developed from Kajanus Pickett, a singer-songwriter duo that had formed when Phil Pickett and Kajanus met in 1970 at E H Morris, a music publisher where Pickett briefly worked. They later recorded the album Hi Ho Silver for Signpost Records. Sailor first came together in 1973 with the addition of musicians Henry Marsh (ex-Gringo) and Grant Serpell (ex-Affinity).

The group's work included Kajanus's invention the Nickelodeon, a musical instrument made of pianos, synthesizers and glockenspiels that allowed the four-piece band to reproduce on stage the acoustic arrangements that they had done in the recording studio.

The group's first UK single was "Traffic Jam" from their first album, Sailor. "A Glass of Champagne", issued late the following year from the Trouble album, reached No. 2 in the UK Singles Chart. The follow-up "Girls, Girls, Girls" also made the Top 10, but of their subsequent singles, only "One Drink Too Many" registered in the UK Top 40.

Sailor's original line-up split up in 1978, although Pickett and Marsh released more material as Sailor with Gavin and Virginia David in 1980, with an album of Pickett compositions called Dressed for Drowning, produced by James William Guercio at his Caribou studio in Colorado (Epic / Caribou).

Revival
In 1989, Sailor reformed to release a new album after a ten-year silence with two new singles, "The Secretary" and "La Cumbia". The band started touring again in 1993, and performed on many television programmes in Europe. In 1995, Kajanus departed the band again to pursue other projects.
The arrival of Peter Lincoln saw Sailor issue their first live album, Live in Berlin. Original member Marsh left in 1999, and was replaced by Anthony England. England left the band in May 2001, to be replaced by Rob Alderton; the new line-up recorded their first DVD in November 2002. In 2004, Sailor were voted the 45th-most successful pop band of the last 40 years in Germany. A biography of the group by James McCarraher, entitled A Glass of Champagne – The Official Sailor Story, was published in June 2004. Alderton left in July 2005, and Marsh returned to the line-up.

Buried Treasure, a double album of previously recorded material, was released in February 2006. By September, Lincoln had left Sailor to join Sweet. After this, Marsh's classically trained son Oliver joined the band as their new guitarist and lead singer. He was replaced in 2009 by Nick Parvin but rejoined in May 2011 along with his brother Thomas, who joined as drummer, replacing Serpell.

Band members
Georg Kajanus (born Prince Georg Johan Tchegodaieff, 9 June 1946, Trondheim, Norway)
1973–1979, 1990–1995: lead vocals, 12-string guitars, acoustic guitars, charango, Veracruzana harp, harmonium, synthesisers, "Klockwork machinery" 
Henry Marsh (born Ian Henry Murray Marsh, 8 December 1948, Bath, Somerset)
1973–1999, 2005–present: Nickelodeon, accordion, piano, marimbas, synthesised brass and reed, synthesisers, acoustic/electric guitars, computer programming, vocals
Phil Pickett (born Philip Stuart Pickett, 19 November 1946, Münster, Germany)
1973–present (except Checkpoint): bass Nickelodeon, piano, guitarron, synthesised strings, calliope, xylophone, bass, cruz bass, Hammond organ, mandolin, autoharp, vocals (lead vocals on Dressed for Drowning)
Grant Serpell (born Stephen Grant Serpell, 9 February 1944, Maidenhead, Berkshire)
1973–1979, 1990–2011: drums, percussion, vocals
Gavin David
1980: vocals
Virginia David
1980: lead and backing vocals
Peter Lincoln
1996–2006: 12-string and 6-string acoustic guitars, electric guitar, charango, lead vocals
Anthony England
1999–2001: Nickelodeon, vocals
Rob Alderton
2001–2005: Nickelodeon, accordion, vocals
Oliver Marsh
2006–2009: guitar, lead vocals
Nick Parvin 
2009–2011:guitar, lead vocals
Oliver Marsh
2011– present: guitar, lead vocals
Thomas Marsh
2011–present: drums, percussion, vocals

Discography

Studio albums

Compilations
1978 Greatest Hits Vol.1
1990 Girls, Girls, Girls: The Very Best of Sailor 
1994 Hits and Highlights 
1995 Greatest Hits – Best of the Best 
1996 Legacy: Greatest and Latest 
1999 Girls, Girls, Girls 
2002  Sailor
2005  Best: Down by the Docks 
2006  Buried Treasure (double CD)
2007  Buried Treasure (single CD)
2007  The Best of Sailor 
2007  A Glass of Champagne: All the Hits 
2008  Traffic Jam: Sound and Vision (CD/DVD)

Live albums and DVDs
1998 Live in Berlin 
2003 Pirate Copy: Sailor Live in Concert (DVD)
2005 Sailor Live 
2005 Sailor Live: One Drink Too Many

Singles

Notes

Sailor, the Musical Journey

The premiere of Sailor, the Musical Journey at the Carnegie Hall was in July 2006 in Dunfermline, Scotland. The new musical was written by Bill Blenman and made up entirely of Kajanus compositions.

References

Other sources
 James McCarraher, A Glass of Champagne: The Official "Sailor" Story,

External links
Sailor official website

English pop music groups
Musical groups established in 1973
English glam rock groups
Epic Records artists